Rabindra Nath Ghosh is an Indian politician currently serving as the Chairman of Cooch Behar Municipality. He is one of the prominent leaders of All India Trinamool Congress, the ruling political party of West Bengal. He previously served as a Cabinet Minister of the Government of West Bengal from 2016 to 2021. Moreover, Ghosh was also a two time MLA of West Bengal Legislative Assembly from 2011 to 2021.

References 

West Bengal MLAs 2016–2021
Living people
Trinamool Congress politicians from West Bengal
Year of birth missing (living people)
People from Cooch Behar district